The pygmy beaked whale (Mesoplodon peruvianus), also known as the bandolero beaked whale, Peruvian beaked whale and lesser beaked whale, is the smallest of the mesoplodonts and one of the newest discoveries. There were at least two dozen sightings of an unknown beaked whale named Mesoplodon sp. A before the initial classification, and those are now believed to be synonymous with the species. The species was formally described in 1991, based on ten specimens obtained from Peru between 1976 and 1989, including a  adult male as the type specimen. A specimen that stranded at Paracas, Peru in 1955 (first tentatively identified as Andrews' beaked whale) has since been identified as a pygmy beaked whale. Since 1987, there have been an additional 40 sightings of the species, for a total of 65 (as of 2001).

Description
The body of the pygmy beaked whale is the rather typical spindle shape of the genus, although the tail is unusually thick. The melon is somewhat bulbous and slopes down into a rather short beak. The mouthline in males has a very distinct arch with two teeth protruding slightly from the gum line before the apex. The coloration is typically dark gray on the top and lighter below, especially on the lower jaw, throat, and behind the umbilicus. Males may have distinct pale "chevron" patterns on their backs. This species' size is around 4 meters (13 feet) long in mature animals, and around 1.6 meters (5.2  ft) when born.

Population and distribution
This beaked whale has been recorded in the eastern tropical Pacific between Baja California and Peru through sightings and strandings. Further strandings have been recorded in Chile and Monterey Bay (a 3.6 m (11.8 ft) female found at Salinas State Beach), and a fresh specimen in Humboldt County, CA  in 1995, 2001, and 2012, respectively, extending the species' range far to the north and south. Another specimen washed up in New Zealand, although this stranding is considered extralimital.

Behavior
Little is known about the group behaviors of this whale, and small groups have been seen. Stomach contents reveal at least one specimen is a fish eater, as opposed to the squid normally eaten by the genus.

Conservation
This species may be quite vulnerable to gillnets in Peru, since scientists found six dead adults in a very small sample.

Specimens
MNZ MM002142, collected from Oaro overbridge, south of Kaikoura, New Zealand, 19 October 1993.

See also

List of cetaceans

References

Sources
Encyclopedia of Marine Mammals. Edited by William F. Perrin, Bernd Wursig, and J.G.M Thewissen. Academic Press, 2002. 
Sea Mammals of the World. Written by Randall R. Reeves, Brent S. Steward, Phillip J. Clapham, and James A. Owell. A & C Black, London, 2002.

External links
Cetaceans of the World
CMS
Whale & Dolphin Conservation Society (WDCS)
Pygmy Beaked Whale - ARKive bio
Peruvian Beaked Whale - The Beaked Whale Resource

Mesoplodont whales
Mammals described in 1991
Cetaceans of the Pacific Ocean